Ivan Terence Sanderson (January 30, 1911 – February 19, 1973) was a British biologist and writer born in Edinburgh, Scotland, who became a naturalized citizen of the United States. Along with Belgian-French biologist Bernard Heuvelmans, Sanderson was a founding figure of cryptozoology, a pseudoscience and subculture. Sanderson authored material on paranormal subjects and wrote fiction under the pen name Terence Roberts.

Biography
Born in Scotland, Sanderson traveled widely in his youth. His father, who manufactured whisky professionally, was killed by a rhinoceros while assisting a documentary film crew in Kenya in 1925.

As a teenager, Sanderson attended Eton College and at 17 years old began a yearlong trip around the world, spending most time in Asia. Sanderson graduated BA Hons in zoology from Cambridge University faculty of Biology, a degree traditionally upgraded to MA (Cantab) in botany and ethnology after six years without further study.

He became famous claiming to have seen an "olitiau" (a large cryptid bat) after being attacked by a creature he described as "the Granddaddy of all bats". Sanderson conducted a number of expeditions as a teenager and young man into tropical areas in the 1920s and 1930s, gaining fame for his animal collecting as well as his popular writings on nature and travel.

During World War II, Sanderson worked for British Naval Intelligence, in charge of counter-espionage against the Germans in the Caribbean, then for British Security Coordination, finally finishing out the war as a press agent in New York City. Afterwards, Sanderson made New York his home and became a naturalized U.S. citizen. In the 1960s Sanderson lived in Knowlton Township in northwestern New Jersey before moving to Manhattan. He died in 1973.

Nature writing
Sanderson published: Animal Treasure, a report of an expedition to the jungles of then-British West Africa; Caribbean Treasure, an account of an expedition to Trinidad, Haiti, and Surinam, begun in late 1936 and ending in late 1938; and Living Treasure, an account of an expedition to Jamaica, British Honduras (now Belize) and the Yucatan.

Illustrated with Sanderson's drawings, they are accounts of his scientific expeditions, but they are addressed to a popular audience and include somewhat purple prose of the beauties of nature, as well as humorous anecdotes, some of which may be exaggerated. Sanderson's serious scientific work was published in scientific journals. He collected animals for museums and scientific institutions, and included detailed studies of their behaviors and environments. He also killed and dissected some while in the field.

Media appearances 

In 1948 Sanderson began appearing on American radio and television, speaking as a naturalist and displaying animals. In 1951 he appeared with Patty Painter  on the world's first regularly scheduled colour TV series, The World is Yours. Sanderson also provided the introduction for 12 episodes of the 1953 television wildlife series Osa Johnson's The Big Game Hunt a.k.a. The Big Game Hunt featuring the films of Martin and Osa Johnson.

Sanderson's television appearances with animals led to what he termed his "animal business." Initially Sanderson borrowed or rented animals from zoos in the New York metropolitan area for his TV appearances. In 1950 at a meeting of the National Speleological Society, he met 20-year-old Edgar O. ("Eddie") Schoenenberger, who by 1952 was his assistant (and ultimately partner) in his animal business. Schoenenberger suggested that, instead of "renting" animals, they should purchase and house them, and gain some additional income by displaying them in a zoo. He refurbished and expanded  moving 200 of his rarest animals to a barn nearby so he could keep close watch on them. Then, in the spring of 1954, he established  "Ivan Sanderson’s Jungle Zoo" (and Laboratory), a permanent, summer, roadside attraction near Manunka Chunk, White Township, Warren County, New Jersey. Sanderson also developed and deployed winter traveling exhibits of rare and unusual animals for sports shows and department stores. A fire on the night of Tuesday or early morning hours of Wednesday, February 2, 1955 destroyed his collection of 45 rare animals kept in a barn at his New Jersey home. Ivan Sanderson's Jungle Zoo was flooded out by the Delaware River during the floods caused by Hurricane Diane on August 19, 1955.

Sanderson often traveled from his New Jersey home to his New York apartment to visit friends and to appear on radio and television programs.

During the 1950s and 1960s, Sanderson was widely published in such journals of popular adventure as True, Sports Afield, and Argosy, as well as in the 1940s in general-interest publications such as the Saturday Evening Post. In the 1950s, Sanderson was a frequent guest on John Nebel's paranormal-themed radio program. He was a frequent guest on The Garry Moore Show,  where he brought live specimens on talk shows. His friend and fellow cryptozoologist Loren Coleman  says that Sanderson could be skeptical. In "Mysterious America,"  Coleman writes that Sanderson discovered the 1909 "Jersey Devil" incident was an elaborate real estate hoax.

Cryptozoology and the paranormal 

Sanderson was an early follower of Charles Fort. Later he became known for writings on topics such as cryptozoology, a word Sanderson coined in the early 1940s, with special attention to the search for lake monsters, sea serpents, Mokèlé-mbèmbé, giant penguins, Yeti, and Sasquatch.

Sanderson's book Abominable Snowmen argued that there are four living types of abominable snowmen scattered over five continents. The book was criticized in the Science journal as unscientific. The reviewer noted that "unfortunately, the author's concept of what constitutes scientific evidence will scarcely be accepted by most scientists. His standards are unbelievably low." Sanderson relied upon anecdotal reports and dubious footprints.

Sanderson's credibility was damaged with his endorsement of the giant penguin hoax. In 1948 (and the next decade), giant three-toed footprints were found at Clearwater Beach in Florida. Sanderson proclaimed that the footprints were impossible to fake and were made by a fifteen-foot tall penguin. In 1988, prankster Tony Signorini admitted that with a friend he had made the footprints by a pair of cast iron feet attached to high-top sneakers.

Sanderson founded the Ivan T. Sanderson Foundation in August 1965 on his New Jersey property, which became the Society for the Investigation of the Unexplained (SITU) in 1967. SITU was a non-profit organization that investigated claims of strange phenomena ignored by mainstream science.

Vile vortices 
Sanderson has been described as credulous for suggesting that aircraft and boats went missing at Devil's Sea because of a wrinkle in spacetime, gravitational or magnetic aberrations, extra-terrestrials or mysterious underwater people. Larry Kusche, who traced the Devil's sea stories to their original sources, found that the phenomena of Devil's Sea had been fabricated and was nothing more than an exaggeration based on the loss of several fishing boats over a period of five years.

In 1968, Sanderson introduced the concept of the "vile vortex". Vile vortices are supposed to be "anomalic regions" regularly distributed on Earth where disproportionately many strange phenomena occur, such as disappearances, UFO sightings, or poltergeist activity. The first and second "vile vortex" were the Bermuda Triangle and the Devil's Sea. Larry Kusche analyzed the data underlying that idea and found it insufficient.

Personal life
Sanderson was married twice. His wife Alma accompanied him in the travels discussed in Caribbean Treasure and Living Treasure.

He died of brain cancer in New Jersey, which had become his adopted home.

Works

Nature/travel
Green silence: Travels through the jungles of the Orient, D. McKay Co., 1974, .
Animal Treasure, The Viking Press, September 1937, hardback; Pyramid Books, July 1966, paperback.
Ivan Sanderson's Book of Great Jungles, Julian Messner, 1965, hardback.
Caribbean Treasure, The Viking Press, November 1939, hardback, ; Pyramid Books, November 1965, paperback, second printing July 1966.
Living Treasure, The Viking Press, April 1941, hardback, second printing April 1945; Pyramid Books, September 1965, paperback.
The Dynasty of Abu a History and Natural History of the elephants and Their Relatives Past and Present, Alfred A. Knopf, 1962, hardback.
The Continent We Live On, Random House, 1961. 
Living mammals of the world in color: A treasury of real-life, natural-color photographs and complete up-to-date, accurate description of 189 mammals, Hanover House, 1958.
Follow the Whale, Little Brown, 1956, hardback.
The Silver Mink, Little, Brown, and Company, 1952. Young adult fiction.
How to Know the American Mammals, Little, Brown and Company, 1951, hardback.

Paranormal subjects
Things and More Things (essays), combined and reprinted by Adventures Unlimited Press, 2007, paperback, 
Abominable Snowmen: Legend Come to Life: The Story Of Sub-Humans On Five Continents From The Early Ice Age Until Today, Adventures Unlimited Press, 2006, paperback, .
Invisible Residents: The Reality of Underwater UFOs, with David Hatcher Childress, Adventures Unlimited Press, 2005, paperback, .
Investigating the Unexplained (essays) Prentice Hall, 1972, hardback, .
More Things (essays), Pyramid Books, 1969, paperback.
Uninvited Visitors: A Biologist Looks At UFOs, Cowles Education Corporation, 1967, hardback.
Things (essays), Pyramid Books, 1967, paperback.

Fiction under the name Terence Roberts
Mystery Schooner, Viking Press, 1944, hard cover.
Report on the Status Quo, Merlin Press, 1955, hard cover.
Black Allies (short story) published in The Saint Magazine: March [Mar] 1967

References

Further reading

Clark, Jerome, Unexplained! 347 Strange Sightings, Incredible Occurrences, and Puzzling Physical Phenomena; Detroit, Visible Ink Press; 1993, 
 Hall, Mark A., "The World of Ivan Sanderson," in Wonders 8 (3): 67–85 (in annual compilation), Sept. 2003
 Hall, Mark A., "The Works of Ivan Terence Sanderson (1911–1973)," in Wonders 8 (3): 86–90 (in annual compilation), Sept. 2003
Story, Ronald, "Sanderson, Ivan T[erence]" pages 315-317 in The Encyclopedia of UFOs, Ronald Story, editor; Garden City: Doubleday & Company, Inc, 1980,

External links
Abominable Snowmen, full text at sacred-texts.com
 
 

1911 births
1973 deaths
American fortean writers
British naturalists
Cryptozoologists
Writers from Edinburgh
Deaths from brain cancer in the United States
Deaths from cancer in New Jersey
British nature writers
20th-century American non-fiction writers
20th-century naturalists
People educated at Eton College
Naturalized citizens of the United States
British emigrants to the United States
Television personalities from Edinburgh
Admiralty personnel of World War II